Valiyapally (Malayalam: വലിയ പള്ളി, "Principal church") is a title given to a main church in a diocese of the Christian denominations  Malankara Orthodox Syrian Church and Jacobite Syrian Christian Church.

For a church to be declared as a Valiyapally it has to meet any of the following criteria: 
 Parent parish of 5 parishes in the Region
 Have more than 500 families in the parish

List of valiyapallys

Malankara Orthodox Syrian Church 
 St. Thomas Orthodox Syrian Church (Kundara valiyapally) Kundara, Kollam 
 St. Mary's Orthodox Syrian Valiyapally, Niranam
 St. George Orthodox Syrian Valiyapally, Anchal
 St. Stephen's Orthodox Syrian Valiyapally, Kattanam 
 St. George Orthodox Syrian Valiyapally, Kalanjoor
 St. Mary's Orthodox Syrian Valiyapally, Kalloopara
 St Mary's Orthodox Syrian Valiyapally, Perissery
 St Thomas Orthodox Syrian Valiyapally, Kallissery
 St. John's Orthodox Valiyapally, Ulanadu
 Rajadhiraja St. Mary's Syrian Orthodox Cathedral (Piravom Valiyapally)
 St. Andrew's Orthodox Valiyapally, Secunderabad
 St. Mary's Orthodox Syrian Church Valiyapally, Kallada (Shrine of St. Andrew of Kallada)
 St. George Orthodox Syrian Valiyapally Palarivattom
 St Peters and St Pauls Orthodox Syrian Valiyapally, Kollencherry 
 St George Orthodox Syrian Valiyapally, Kizhmury
 St George Orthodox Syrian Valiyapally Puthupally (Puthupally church, the revered Shrine of St. George)
 St George Orthodox Syrian Valiyapally Kadamattom (Pilgrim Church)
 St George Orthodox Valiayapally, Mylapra (Pilgrim Church)
 St George Orthodox Syrian Valiyapally, Chandanapally (Shrine of St. George)
 St John's Orthodox Valiyapally, Vakathanam
 St Philexinox Orthodox Valiyapally, Attachakal
 St George Orthodox Valiyapally, Pudupady(Kozhikode)
 St George Orthodox Valiyapally, Kelakom(Kannur)
 St. George Orthodox Valiyapally Chungathara (Malapuram)
 St George Orthodox Valiyapally, Mulakulam North, Piravom
 St. Mary's Orthodox Valiyapally, Prakkanam
 St. Mary's Orthodox Valiyapally, Ullannoor
 St. George Orthodox Valiyapally, Kanakappalam
 St Mathews Orthodox Valiyapally Kozhencherry
 St. Behanan's Orthodox Valiyapally Vennikulam
 St. Mary's Orthodox Valiyapally, Farmers Branch (Dallas), Texas, USA

Jacobite Syrian Christian Church 
 St Mary's Jacobite Valiyapally, Thamarachal, 
 St. Mary's Jacobite Syrian Valiyapally, Thuruthiply
 Mar Behanam Jacobite Syrian Valiyapally, Vengola
 Martha Mariam Cathedral (St. Mary's Jacobite Syrian Cathedral) Valiyapally, Kothamangalam
 St. Stephen's Bes Ania Valiyapally, Chelad
 St. Mary's Jacobite Valiyapally, Nedumon, Ezhamkulam
 St. Mary's Jacobite Syrian Orthodox Valiyapally, V.Kottayam
St.George Jacobite Syrian Valiyapally Kunnackal

Knanaya Syrian Orthodox 
 St. Mary's Knanaya Valiyapally Kallissery

 St. George's Knanaya Valiyapally, Neelamperoor
 St. Jacob's Knanaya Syrian Valiya Pally, Ramamangalam
 Ranni St Thomas Knanaya Valiyapally

 Kottayam Knanaya Valiyapally, Kottayam 

Christianity in Kerala
Oriental Orthodox church buildings in India